Wu Hsing-kuo is a Taiwanese actor of the silver screen and theater, known for both his performance of complex movie roles as much as for his innovative adaptations of Western classics into traditional Peking Opera.

Wu was trained in classical Peking Opera since the age of 11 in Taiwan's state-run Fu-Hsing Chinese Opera School, specializing in wu sheng (male martial) roles. He was admitted with honors into the Theatre Department of Chinese Culture University in Taipei, trained under master Chou Cheng-jung (Zhou Zheng-rong) and became the leading dancer of Lin Hwai-min's Cloud Gate Dance Theater. However, his teacher Chou Cheng-jung (Zhou Zheng-rong) considered him  as a pretentious student who didn't focus on study and finally abandoned him in 1989.  Since then, Chou Cheng-jung (died in 2000) never met him anymore. In addition, most of the traditional Chinese opera audiences do not recognize him as a qualified actor.

He was the leading actor and director of four Shakespeare adaptations, including the critically acclaimed Kingdom of Desire (慾望城國), an adaptation of Macbeth, and King Lear (李爾在此), in which Wu plays all the parts.

In 1992, Wu was awarded a Fulbright Scholarship to study in New York with Richard Schechner. That year, he also won the Hong Kong Film Award for best new actor.

Wu is currently artistic director of the Contemporary Legend Theatre, and continues to take on challenging roles in both the modern theatre and Chinese Opera. He crosses the fields of traditional opera, dance, modern theatre, cinema, and television.

Filmography

Films

TV series

Awards
 Awarded Best New Performer at  the Hong Kong Film Awards in (1992).
 Nominated for Best Actor at the 13th Hong Kong Film Awards (1994) for his role in Temptation of a Monk

External links
 
 
 HK cinemagic entry

Taiwanese male film actors
Living people
1953 births
Male actors from Kaohsiung
Taiwanese male television actors
Taiwanese male Peking opera actors
21st-century Taiwanese male actors
20th-century Taiwanese male actors
Chinese Culture University alumni
21st-century Taiwanese male singers
20th-century Taiwanese male singers